John Kennedy (born March 22, 1938) is an American political figure who served as a Republican member of the Pennsylvania House of Representatives from 1981 to 1988.

Kennedy was a candidate for lieutenant governor in the 2010 election.

References

External links
Campaign site
"How to Run for Office" (website of the Pennsylvania Cable Network). Section "Meet the Experts" includes photograph of John Kennedy along with brief description.
 Pittsburgh Tribune-Review article dated July 24, 2011, concerning John Kennedy

Republican Party members of the Pennsylvania House of Representatives
Living people
1938 births